Beta Theta Pi Fraternity House may refer to:

 (In the United States by state)

 Beta Theta Pi Fraternity House (Champaign, Illinois), listed on the National Register of Historic Places in Champaign County, Illinois
 Beta Theta Pi Fraternity House (Chapel Hill, North Carolina), listed on the National Register of Historic Places in Orange County, North Carolina
 Beta Theta Pi Fraternity House, The University of Oklahoma, Norman, Oklahoma, listed on the National Register of Historic Places in Cleveland County, Oklahoma
 Old Beta Theta Pi Fraternity House, Eugene, Oregon, listed on the National Register of Historic Places in Oregon